The Río Conchos (Conchos River) is a large river in the Mexican state of Chihuahua. It joins the Río Bravo del Norte (known in the United States as the Rio Grande) at the town of Ojinaga, Chihuahua.

Description
The Rio Conchos is the main river in the state of Chihuahua and the Rio Grande's largest tributary. It is one of the most important river systems in all of northern Mexico. The Conchos has several reservoirs that make use of its water for agricultural and hydropower uses.

Course
The Conchos rises in the Sierra Madre Occidental in the municipality of Bocoyna, Chihuahua, where it heads east and receives several tributaries along the way. At Valle de Zaragoza municipality, Chihuahua, it is stopped at the La Boquilla Dam, the largest in Chihuahua forming Toronto Lake. It then heads east again, forming Colina Lake and then passes through Camargo, Chihuahua, the main agricultural center in the region, where it receives the Florido as a tributary.

From there, the Conchos heads north, receiving the San Pedro near Delicias, Chihuahua, entering the Chihuahua Desert and cutting a path through it, before turning to the northeast. At Aldama, Chihuahua, it is dammed by the Presa El Granero, then cuts through the Peguis Canyon, before forming a last dam (Toribio Ortega) near Ojinaga. At Ojinaga, it joins the Rio Bravo (Rio Grande in the U.S.).

Ecology
The World Wide Fund for Nature (WWF) has included the Rio Conchos in its Global 200 Freshwater Ecoregions assessment. The Global 200 is a list of freshwater ecoregions (rivers systems and lakes, for example) that the WWF considers of global importance for biodiversity conservation. The WWF's assessment of the Rio Conchos rates its biological distinctiveness as "globally outstanding" and its conservation status as critically endangered, putting it in the "priority I" category of needing conservation attention.

The Rio Conchos contains the only free-flowing large river environment left in the Rio Grande drainage basin. Its river and spring habitat ecosystems are relatively intact and support a highly endemic fish fauna. Twelve of its forty-seven native fish are endemic, as are twelve of its 46 native reptile and amphibian species. The strong biodiversity has survived in part because the river's ecology has not been affected by channel modifications. The Rio Conchos region is significant not only for its surface water biota, but also its specialized spring and cave habitats, which contribute to the region's high endemism. However, conditions are being damaged by industrial pollution, sewage, agricultural wastes, flow regulation, exotic species, and overgrazing. Other threats include poor land and water management practices, such as clear-cutting along the upper Rio Conchos.

See also
 List of rivers of Mexico
 List of longest rivers of Mexico
 List of tributaries of the Rio Grande

References

 
Conchos
Tributaries of the Rio Grande
Rivers of the Sierra Madre Occidental
Rivers of Chihuahua (state)
Chihuahuan Desert
Natural history of the Mexican Plateau